Choi Keum-kang (born April 26, 1989) is a South Korean professional baseball pitcher for the NC Dinos of the KBO League.

References

External links
Career statistics and player information from Korea Baseball Organization

Choi Keum-kang at NC Dinos Baseball Club 

NC Dinos players
KBO League pitchers
South Korean baseball players
Inha University alumni
Sportspeople from Incheon
1989 births
Living people